Cummings is an unincorporated community in Atchison County, Kansas, United States. Cummings has a post office with ZIP code 66016.

History
Cummings (formerly Cummingsville) was platted in 1883. It was named for its founder, William Cummings.

References

Further reading

External links
 Atchison County maps: Current, Historic, KDOT

Unincorporated communities in Atchison County, Kansas
Unincorporated communities in Kansas
1883 establishments in Kansas
Populated places established in 1883